Sebastián López Serrano (born 18 August 1961), known as Chano, is a Spanish retired footballer who played as a right back.

He appeared in 165 La Liga games during six seasons, representing in the competition Cádiz, Mallorca and Málaga.

Club career

Cádiz
Born in Tétouan, Morocco to Spanish parents, Chano made his professional debut for Cádiz CF on 13 January 1980, in a 0–2 Segunda División defeat away to Deportivo Alavés. From 1981 to 1984 he achieved two promotions to La Liga, and an equal number of relegations. 

On 12 September 1982, Chano scored the first and only league goal for the Andalusians, in a 1–0 success at Atlético Madrid B for the second level championship. He made the first of 31 appearances for the club in the Spanish top flight on 27 December 1981, coming on as a 70th-minute substitute in a 5–1 home routing of CD Castellón.

Mallorca / Málaga
In July 1984, Chano signed for RCD Mallorca in the second tier, contributing with 27 games to the Balearic Islands side's ascension to the top flight in his second season and leaving following its relegation in his fourth. He then joined CD Málaga, playing two campaigns in the former competition and as many in division two, scoring twice in 1990–91 and retiring in 1992 at the age of 30 from a broken tibia and fibula.

International career
Chano won 11 caps for Spain at youth level, including two for the under-21s. He scored twice at the 1981 FIFA World Youth Championship for the under-20 team, in a group stage exit.

Personal life
In May 2006, Chano was called to court in San Fernando, Cádiz on the charge of being violently abusive towards his son. He had previously been jailed in Cádiz on a charge of child grooming, of which he was later released innocent. In 2003, he was convicted in Málaga of making threats – including death threats – to a woman with whom he had a daughter, also being convicted for threats to his wife in October of that year.

References

External links

Stats at Cadistas1910 

1961 births
Living people
People from Tétouan
Spanish footballers
Association football defenders
La Liga players
Segunda División players
Cádiz CF B players
Cádiz CF players
RCD Mallorca players
CD Málaga footballers
Spain youth international footballers
Spain under-21 international footballers